Alan Parsons' A Walk Down Abbey Road was a concert tour that was launched in North America in 2001 to pay tribute to The Beatles and promote the hits of various headlining band members. Similar to Ringo Starr's All Starr Band tours, each successive year the band members swapped out and featured the songs of the new line-up.

The first set included all band members assembled to play each other's hits. The second set featured all Beatles songs performed by various band members depending on the specific tune and the strength and style of the performer.

Although certainly successful enough to continue over two years, the show was mired by some problems, not the least of which was prohibitive concessions having to be paid to The Beatles for the use of the name "Abbey Road".

An obvious play on concert-goers expectations with Who bassist John Entwistle in the group, the second song of the opening set was Open My Eyes from Todd Rundgren's first band, The Nazz. The chord pattern at the beginning is lifted directly from The Who's "I Can't Explain". It was one of Entwistle's last concert series as he died on 27 June 2002, one day before the scheduled first show of The Who's 2002 US tour.

2001 tour

Band
 Alan Parsons: vocals, guitar, keyboards
 Todd Rundgren: vocals, guitar, backing vocals
 Ann Wilson: vocals, guitar, backing vocals
 John Entwistle: bass guitar, vocals
 David Pack: guitar, backing vocals

Additional musicians:
 Godfrey Townsend: guitar, backing vocals (from John Entwistle Band)
 Steve Luongo: drums (from John Entwistle Band)
 John Beck
 Spazzy McGee

Set list: Set 1
 "Magical Mystery Tour (Pack, Wilson)
 "Open My Eyes" (Rundgren)
 "Eye In The Sky" (Parsons)
 "Crazy On You" (Wilson)
 "My Wife" (Entwistle)
 "Hello, It's Me" (Rundgren)
 "Don't Answer Me" (Parsons)
 "Biggest Part Of Me" (Pack)
 "How Much I Feel" (Pack)
 "Bang The Drum All Day" (Rundgren)
 "The Real Me" (Townsend)
 "Dreamboat Annie" (Wilson)
 "Games People Play" (Parsons)
 "Barracuda" (Wilson)
 "My Generation" (Pack, Rundgren)

Set list: Set 2
 "Back in the U.S.S.R." (Pack)
 "Lady Madonna" (Rundgren)
 "I'm Down" (Wilson)
 "The Fool on the Hill" (Pack)
 "While My Guitar Gently Weeps" (Rundgren, Wilson)
 "Here Comes the Sun" (Entwistle)
 "Lucy in the Sky with Diamonds" (Pack, Wilson)
 "You've Got to Hide Your Love Away" (Rundgren acoustic solo)
 "Maybe I'm Amazed" (Wilson)
 "Rain" (Rundgren)
 "Blackbird" (Parsons acoustic solo)
 "Everybody's Got Something to Hide Except Me and My Monkey" (Wilson)
 "Revolution" (Rundgren)
 "Day Tripper" (Pack, Rundgren)
 "Ticket to Ride" (Pack, Rundgren)
 "I Want to Hold Your Hand" (Pack, Rundgren)
 "Hey Jude" (Wilson)

Encore
 "Birthday" (All)
 "Golden Slumbers" / "Carry That Weight" / "The End" (Wilson)

Tour dates

2002 tour

Band
 Alan Parsons: vocals, guitar, keyboards
 Todd Rundgren: vocals, guitar, backing vocals (Selected dates)
 Christopher Cross: vocals, guitar, backing vocals
 Jack Bruce (of Cream): bass guitar, backing vocals
 Mark Farner (of Grand Funk): vocals, guitar, backing vocals
 Eric Carmen (of The Raspberries): vocals, guitar, backing vocals (Eric Carmen was originally scheduled to take part, and perform at the shows where Todd Rundgren was not available, but he backed out before the first show that he was scheduled to appear) 

Additional musicians:
 Godfrey Townsend: Guitar, backing vocals
 John Beck: keyboards
 Steve Murphy: drums

References

2001 concert tours
2002 concert tours
Musical tributes to the Beatles